Clifford Kennedy Berryman (April 2, 1869 – December 11, 1949) was a Pulitzer Prize–winning cartoonist with The Washington Star newspaper from 1907 to 1949. He was previously a cartoonist for The Washington Post from 1891 to 1907.

During his career, Berryman drew thousands of cartoons commenting on American presidents and politics. Political figures he lampooned included former Presidents Theodore Roosevelt, Franklin D. Roosevelt, and Harry S. Truman. He is particularly known for his cartoons "Remember the Maine" and "Drawing the Line in Mississippi."

Berryman was a prominent figure in Washington, D.C. President Harry S. Truman once told him, "You are ageless and timeless. Presidents, senators and even Supreme Court justices come and go, but the Monument and Berryman stand." Berryman's cartoons can be found at the Library of Congress, the National Archives, and George Washington University, as well as archives that house presidential collections.

Biography

Early life
Berryman was born on April 2, 1869, in Clifton, Kentucky, to James Thomas Berryman and Sallie Church Berryman. Berryman's father often entertained friends and neighbors with drawings of "hillbillies" from their hometown; Clifford inherited his father's knack for drawing.

Editorial cartoons

Berryman was appointed draftsman to the United States Patent Office in Washington, D.C. from 1886 to 1891. During his tenure, Berryman submitted sketches to The Washington Post, and in 1891, he became an understudy of the Posts political cartoonist George Y. Coffin. After Coffin died in 1896, Berryman took over the Post's cartoonist position.

As a political cartoonist, Berryman satirized both Democrats and Republicans, and covered topics such as drought, farm relief, and food prices; representation of the District of Columbia in Congress; labor strikes and legislation; campaigning and elections; political patronage; European coronations; the America's Cup; and the atomic bomb.

In 1898, during the Spanish–American War, The Post printed Berryman's classic illustration "Remember the Maine," which became the battle-cry for American sailors during the War. His November 16, 1902, cartoon, "Drawing the Line in Mississippi," depicted President Theodore Roosevelt showing compassion for a small bear cub. The cartoon inspired New York store owner Morris Michtom to create a new toy and call it the teddy bear.

Berryman worked at the Post until 1907, at which time he was hired by the Washington Star. Berryman was the first cartoonist member of the Gridiron Club and served as the president in 1926.

He drew political cartoons for the Star until his death in 1949. As a Washingtonian, he was an advocate for DC voting rights.

Personal life and death
Berryman married Kate Geddes Durfee on July 5, 1893, and they had three children: Mary Belle (who died as an infant), Florence Seville (she later became an art critic), and James Thomas (who himself became a Pulitzer Prize–winning cartoonist).

Berryman was a Presbyterian and an active member of the Washington Heights Presbyterian Church.

He died December 11, 1949, from a heart ailment, and is buried in Glenwood Cemetery in Washington, D.C.

Awards

In 1944, Berryman was awarded the Pulitzer Prize for Editorial Cartooning for his drawing "Where is the Boat Going." The cartoon depicted President Franklin D. Roosevelt and other government officials trying to steer the USS Mississippi in several different directions.

Clifford K. and James T. Berryman Award for Editorial Cartooning
Since 1989 the National Press Foundation has presented the Clifford K. and James T. Berryman Award' for Editorial Cartooning annually. Previous winners include Chip Bok (1993), Jim Morin (1996), Kevin Kallaugher (2002), Rex Babin (2003), Steve Sack (2006), Matt Wuerker (2010), Nick Anderson (2011), Adam Zyglis (2013), and Clay Bennett (2014).

Gallery

References

External links

Smithsonian Archives of American Art: Berryman Family Papers
Clifford K. Berryman Digital Collection at the Estelle and Melvin Gelman Library
Berryman Teddy Bear Cartoons, Almanac of Theodore Roosevelt
Billy Ireland Cartoon Library & Museum Art Database
Clifford K. Berryman Political Cartoon Collection in the National Archives
Clifford Berryman Cartoon Collection at the Washington DC Public Library

1869 births
1949 deaths
American editorial cartoonists
American Presbyterians
Artists from Kentucky
People from Boyle County, Kentucky
Pulitzer Prize for Editorial Cartooning winners
The Washington Post people
The Washington Star people
Burials at Glenwood Cemetery (Washington, D.C.)